Monochamus blairi is a species of beetle in the family Cerambycidae. It was described by Stephan von Breuning in 1936. They are native to Colombia.

References

blairi
Beetles described in 1936